Danielle Keats Citron is a Jefferson Scholars Foundation Schenck Distinguished Professor in Law at the University of Virginia School of Law, where she teaches  information privacy, free expression, and civil rights law. Citron is the author of "The Fight for Privacy: Protecting Dignity, Identity, and Love in the Digital Age" (forthcoming October 2022) and "Hate Crimes in Cyberspace" (2014). She also serves as the Vice President of the Cyber Civil Rights Initiative, an organization which provides assistance and legislative support to victims of online abuse.  Prior to joining UVA Law, Citron was an Austin B. Fletcher Distinguished Professor of Law at Boston University Law School, and was also the Morton & Sophia Macht Professor of Law at the University of Maryland School of Law.

Biography
Citron graduated from Duke University, and the Fordham University School of Law.

She is an Affiliate Scholar at the Stanford Center for Internet and Society, an Affiliate Fellow at the Yale Information Society Project,  a Tech Fellow at NYU's Policing Project, and a member of the Principles Group for the Harvard-MIT Artificial Intelligence (AI) Fund.

Citron is the author of Hate Crimes in Cyberspace (2014) which was named one of the “20 Best Moments for Women in 2014” by Cosmopolitan magazine. Her second book The Fight for Privacy: Protecting Dignity, Identity, and Love in the Digital Age will be released in October 2022.

In 2017, she was elected as a member of the American Law Institute and currently serves on the Advisory Board of ALI's Information Privacy Principles Project. She is the Vice President and Board Member of the Cyber Civil Rights Initiative, a civil rights and civil liberties project named after her article Cyber Civil Rights (Boston U Law Review, 2009). She serves on the advisory board of Teach Privacy and Without My Consent.  She serves on Twitter's Trust and Safety Council, and the Board of Directors for the Future of Privacy Forum. She sits on the  Electronic Privacy Information Center's Board of Directors, and was the Chair of the Board from 2017 through 2019. In 2019, Citron was awarded a MacArthur Fellowship for her work in cyber harassment.

Citron is an expert on online harassment, and has written for The New York Times, Slate, The Atlantic, The New Scientist, Time, and Al Jazeera. She has been a guest on The Diane Rehm Show, The Kojo Nnamdi Show, and Slates The Gist podcast.  She is also a Forbes contributor. She has authored over 50 law review articles, and she is ranked number 72 out of the 250 most-cited scholars on Hein Online.

Citron helped Maryland State Senator Jon Cardin draft a bill criminalizing the non-consensual publication of nude images, which was passed into law in 2014. From 2014 to December 2016, Citron served as an advisor to Vice President Kamala Harris (then California Attorney General). She served as a member of Harris's Task Force to Combat Cyber Exploitation and Violence Against Women.

Citron is a critic of Section 230 of the Communications Decency Act, stating that it gives online platforms a "free pass" from having to do moderation, while market forces are driving a rise of "salacious, negative, and novel content" on the Internet. In a 2017 Fordham Law Review article with Benjamin Wittes, Citron argued that "the internet will not break [from] denying bad samaritans § 230 immunity". At a House Intelligence Committee hearing in June 2019  and at a House Energy and Commerce Committee hearing in October 2019, Citron proposed the conditioning of Section 230 protection on "reasonable" content moderation practices. The Electronic Frontier Foundation called this proposition "terrifying", arguing it would lead to excessive litigation risks, especially for small businesses. On the other hand, Citron has expressed partial agreement with critics of the 2018 FOSTA act, in particular with regard to uncertainties resulting from the law's "knowing facilitation" standard.

Selected works
Books

 Danielle Keats Citron (forthcoming October 2022). The Fight for Privacy: Protecting Dignity, Identity and Love in our Digital Age. Chatto & Windus. 
 

Book Chapters
 Danielle Keats Citron (2019). Susan Brison and Katharine Gelber, eds. "Why Combating Online Abuse Is Good For Free Speech", in Free Speech in the Digital Age. Oxford University Press
Danielle Keats Citron (with Quinta Jurecic) (2018). "Platform Justice: Content Moderation at an Inflection Point" in Hoover Institute Aegis Series.
Danielle Keats Citron (with Liz Clark Rinehart) (2017). David Gray and Stephen Henderson, eds. "The Surveillance Implications of Combatting Cyber Harassment" in Cambridge Handbook of Surveillance Law.
Danielle Keats Citron (2015). Marc Rotenberg, Jeramie Scott, and Julia Horwitz, eds. "Protecting Sexual Privacy in the Information Age" in Privacy in the Modern Age. New Press. 
 

Op-Eds and News Articles

 Danielle Keats Citron, "Abortion Bans Are Going to Make Stalkerware Even More Dangerous," Slate Magazine, July 5, 2022.
 Danielle Keats Citron, "The End of Roe Means We Need a New Civil Right to Privacy," Slate Magazine, June 27, 2022.
 Danielle Keats Citron, "Fix Section 230 and hold tech companies to account," WIRED, June 5, 2021.
 Danielle Keats Citron, "The Case for Trump's Permanent Ban From Social Media," Slate Magazine, February 5, 2021.
 Danielle Keats Citron, "It's Time to Kick Trump Off Twitter," Slate Magazine, January 6, 2021.
 Robert Chesney, Danielle Keats Citron, and Hany Farid, "All's Clear for Deepfakes: Think Again," Lawfare, May 11, 2020.
 Danielle Keats Citron and Geng Ngarmboonanant, "Be very wary of Trump's health surveillance plans," The Washington Post, April 16, 2020.

Articles

Intimate Privacy's Protection Enables Free Speech, Journal of Free Speech Law (Forthcoming)
Presidential Privacy Violations, Univ. Illinois L. Rev. (Forthcoming)
How To Fix Section 230, B.U. L. Rev. (Forthcoming)
Privacy Injunctions, Emory L.J. (Forthcoming)
Privacy Harms, 102 B.U. L. Rev 793 (2022) (With Daniel J. Solove)
Standing and Privacy Harms: A Critique of TransUnion v. Ramirez, 101 B.U. L. Rev. Online 62 (2021) (With Daniel J. Solove)
A New Compact for Sexual Privacy, 62 Wm. & Mary L. Rev. 1763 (2021) 
The Automated Administrative State: The Crisis of Legitimacy, 70 Emory L.J. 797 (2021) (with Ryan Calo).
Cyber Mobs, Disinformation, and Death Videos: The Internet As It Is and As It Should Be, 118 Mich. L. Rev. 1073 (2020)
The Internet As a Speech Conversion Machine and Other Myths Confounding Section 230 Reform Efforts, U. Chi. Legal F. (2020) (with Mary Anne Franks).
When Law Frees Us to Speak, 87 Fordham L. Rev. 2317 (2019) (with Jonathan Penney).
Why Sexual Privacy Matters for Trust, 96 Wash. U. L. Rev 1189 (2019).
Deep Fakes: The Looming Crisis for Privacy, Democracy, and National Security, 107 Calif. L. Rev. 1753(2019) (with Robert Chesney).

Sexual Privacy, 128 Yale L. J. 1870 (2019).

The Roots of Sexual Privacy: Warren and Brandeis & the Privacy of Intimate Life, 42 Colum J.L. & Arts 383 (2019).
A Poor Mother's Right to Privacy: A Review, 98 B.U. L. Rev. 1139 (2018).
Four Principles for Digital Speech (You Won't Believe #3! )  95 Wash. U. L. Rev. 1353 (2018) (with Neil Richards).
The Problem Isn't Just Backpage: Revising Section 230 Immunity, 2 Geo. Tech. L. Rev. 453 (2018) (with Benjamin Wittes).
Extremist Speech, Compelled Conformity, and Censorship Creep, 93 Notre Dame L. Rev. (2018).
Risk and Anxiety: A Theory of Data Breach Harms, 96 Tex. L. Rev. (2018) (with Daniel J. Solove).
The Internet Will Not Break: Denying Bad Samaritans Section 230 Immunity, Fordham L. Rev. (2017) (with Benjamin Wittes).

 The Privacy Policymaking of State Attorneys General, 92 Notre Dame L. Rev. 747 (2016).

 Spying Inc., 72 Wash. & Lee L. Rev. (2015).

 The Scored Society: Due Process for Automated Predictions, 89 Wash. L. Rev. 1 (2014) (with Frank Pasquale).

 Criminalizing Revenge Porn, 49 Wake Forest L. Rev. 345 (2014) (with Mary Anne Franks).

 Promoting Innovation While Preventing Discrimination: Policy Goals for a Scored Society, 89 Wash. L. Rev. (2014) (with Frank Pasquale).
 The Right to Quantitative Privacy, 98 Minn. L. Rev. 62 (2013) (with David Gray). 
 A Shattered Looking Glass: The Pitfalls and Potential of the Mosaic Theory of Fourth Amendment Privacy, 14 N.C. J.L. & Tech. 381 (2013) (with David Gray).
 Fighting Cybercrime After United States v. Jones, 103 J. Crim. L. & Criminology 745 (2013) (with David Gray and Liz Clark Rinehart). 
 Addressing the Harm of Total Surveillance: A Reply to Professor Neil Richards, 126 Harvard Law Review Forum 262 (2013) (with David Gray). 
 Mainstreaming Privacy Torts, 98 Cal. L. Rev. 1805 (2011).

 Intermediaries and Hate Speech: Fostering Digital Citizenship for the Information Age, 91 B.U. L. Rev. 1435 (2011) (with Helen Norton).
 Network Accountability for the Domestic Intelligence Apparatus, 62 Hastings L.J. 1441 (2011) (with Frank Pasquale).
 Government Speech 2.0, 88 Denv. L. Rev. 899 (2010) (with Helen Norton). 
 Cyber Civil Rights: Looking Forward, 87 Denver University Law Review Online 1 (2010).
 Book Review, Visionary Pragmatism and the Value of Privacy in the Twenty-First Century, 108 Mich. L. Rev. 1107 (2010) (reviewing ) (with Leslie Meltzer Henry).
 Fulfilling Government 2.0's Promise with Robust Privacy Protection, 78 Geo. Wash. L. Rev. 822 (2010).
 Law's Expressive Value in Combating Cyber Gender Harassment, 108 Mich. L. Rev. 373 (2009). 
 Cyber Civil Rights, 89 B.U. L. Rev. 61 (2009).

 Technological Due Process, 85 Wash. U. L. Rev. 1249 (2008).
 Open Code Governance, 16 U. Chi. Legal F. 355 (2008).
 Reservoirs of Danger: The Evolution of Public and Private Law at the Dawn of the Information Age, 80 S. Cal. L. Rev. 241 (2007).
 Minimum Contacts in a Borderless World: Voice over Internet Protocol and the Coming Implosion of Personal Jurisdiction Theory, 39 U.C. Davis L. Rev. 101 (2006).

Awards

2019 MacArthur Fellow
Fastcase 50 2022 Honoree
UMB 2018 Champion of Excellence
2018 Privacy for Policymakers Best Paper Award for "Sexual Privacy"
2016 Privacy for Policymakers Best Paper Award for "The Privacy Policymaking of State Attorneys General" and "Risk and Anxiety: A Theory of Data Breach Harms" (coauthored with Daniel J. Solove)
Best Paper of 2016, International Association of Privacy Practitioners for "The Privacy Policymaking of State Attorneys General"
Best Paper of 2014, International Association of Privacy Practitioners for "The Scored Society" (coauthored with Frank Pasquale)
Top 50 World Thinkers, 2015, Prospect UK magazine (naming 50 "leaders in their fields, engaging in original and profound ways with the central questions of the world today—whether in economics, science, philosophy, religion or feminism. We chose them based on recommendations from our wide pool of writers and editors").
Top 50 Most Influential Marylanders, 2015, Maryland Daily Record

References

External links

Danielle Keats Citron, official site

Duke University alumni
Living people
Fordham University School of Law alumni
University of Maryland, Baltimore faculty
University of Virginia School of Law faculty
Computer law scholars
Year of birth missing (living people)
Place of birth missing (living people)